Jamiul Uloom Jawadia, also known as Jawadia Arabic College, is a Deeni Madarasa (religious educational institution) of Shia Muslims in Banaras (Varanasi) India. Major course of studies include Jurisprudence, Theology and Islamic Literature.

About

It was founded in 1928 by Munaitiq-e-Zaman Maulana Syed Mohammad Sajjad Al-Husaini, the elder son of Jawad-ul-Ulama Ayatollah Syed Ali Jawad Al-Husaini. The main goal of its establishment was the advance provision of especial courses for higher Islamic studies.

Before it was started, founder Maulana Sajjad Al-Husaini made a public appeal to support it financially due to limited resources, obtaining donations from the people of Banaras. The present constitution of Jamiul-Uloom Jawadia was written by Alam-ul-Aalaam Ayatullah Syed Muzaffar Husain Al-Husaini, who was the first "Haadi" (supreme authority) of its managing body, after the death of Maulana Syed Mohammad Sajjad Al-Husaini. After him the second "Haadi" was Aal-e-Jawad-ul-Ulama Mulla Syed Mohammad Tahir Al-Husaini, followed by Maulana Syed Ahmad Hasan (Imam-e-Jum'ah of Banaras).

Over the years, this college produced many religious research scholars and Islamic clerics. The last degree awarded to the students is "Fakhr-ul-Afazil". During the principalship of Zafar-ul-Millat Ayatollah Syed Zafar-ul-Hasan Rizvi there was construction at the college. He also produced a religious monthly magazine, "AL-JAWAD" as an organ for Jamiul-Uloom Jawadia in 1950. He was the third principal who was appointed directly by the supreme authority, Maulana Syed Muzaffar Husain Al-Husaini. °
Following are the principals of Jawadia Arabic College:
 Mulla Syed Mohammad Yusuf Zangipuri, first principal
 Allamah Syed Mohammad Razi Zangipuri, second principal
 Maulana Zafrul Hasan Rizvi, third Principal till 1983
 Maulana Syed Shamimul-Hasan Rizvi, fourth principal, (since 1983)

Famous alumni:
 Saeed Akhtar Rizvi
 Ghulam Rasool Noori

In early 1930s, Jawadia sent the resident Ulema to the Jamaats of East Africa, Madagascar and Somalia.

See also
 Madrasatul Waizeen
 Jamia Nazmia
 Sultanul Madaris
 Tanzeemul Makatib
 Jamiya Imamia at Lucknow, Uttar Pradesh
 Jameatuz Zahra at Lucknow
 Madrasa Khadeejatul Kubra at Lucknow
 Jamia Imania, Varanasi
 Jamiul Uloom Jawadia, Varanasi
 Hoza-e-Ilmiya Wasiqa, Faizabad
 Babul Ilm, Mubarakpur, Azamgarh
 Jamia Haidariya, Khairabad Mau

References

Further reading 
 Dastoor-ul-Amal (written by Maulana Syed Muzaffar Husain Al-Husaini)
 Matla-e-Anwar (written by Maulana Murtaza Husain Sadrul-Afazil)
 Khursheed-e-Khawar (written by Maulana Saeed Akhtar Rizvi)
 Life of Jawad-ul-Ulama (written by Dr.Inayat Ali)
 Short Biography of Mulla syed Mohammad Tahir Al-Husaini (written by Maulana Syed Ahmad Hasan)
 Al-Jawad (monthly magazine) on life of Mulla Syed Mohammad Tahir Al-Husaini.
 Unpublished documents and several other informative sources.

Shia Islam in India
Madrasas in India